Flex Seal is an American brand of adhesive bonding products made by the family-owned company Swift Response in Weston, Florida. Founded on February 28, 2011, the company employs 100 people led by its pitchman and chief executive officer Phil Swift. Flex Seal has become a popular internet meme because of its television advertisement demonstrations of the product in absurd and exaggerated situations, such as a boat sawed fully in half and made seaworthy again with the product, as well as Swift's enthusiasm and loud voice, much like that of the late Billy Mays.

Products 
The company makes a line of adhesive bonding products that are based around the concept of liquid rubber.  

Flex Shot was released as an alternative to a caulk gun.  Flex Tape was released as a waterproof tape.  Flex Glue was released as a fix-all adhesive.

Advertising 

Flex Seal has gained attention for its television advertising, which Inside Edition says has some exaggerated implied claims about the lifespan of the bond.  Inside Edition later tested the Flex Paste product and found that it performed as advertised.

Since 2013, the company has sponsored NASCAR Xfinity Series team JD Motorsports, sponsoring drivers who have included Ross Chastain, Landon Cassill, and Jeffrey Earnhardt. During one 2017 race, Flex Tape was used to repair crash damage on the car the company sponsored, which was driven by Garrett Smithley.

References 

2011 establishments in California
Companies based in California
Infomercials
Adhesive tape
American inventions
Brand name materials
Internet memes
Internet memes introduced in 2017
American companies established in 2011
Manufacturing companies established in 2011
Companies based in Florida